Elvestad is a well-known traffic junction area and a village in the Hobøl municipality in the Østfold county, Norway. It is where the "Riksvei" (country road route) 120 and Europe Way (European route) E18 cross each other. Riksvei 120 goes between Gardermoen airport via Gjerdrum municipality (and then Lillestrøm City) in the Akershus county and Moss City in the Østfold county.

Elvestad is the administrative centre of Hobøl municipality (even if it is the least populus centre in Hobøl), because the municipality house is placed just by the intersection area of the national main routes E18 / Riksvei 120.

Elvestad is host to the municipality administration and an Asylum-Seeker Centre. Topographically it is situated in a small valley that is around two kilometers wide at the widest point.

Municipality 
Hobøl is one of 10 municipalities which, due to their geographical placement miles away from the fjord / coast line, can be put into the area of Indre Østfold (Inner Østfold, the part of Østfold which do not have fjord or coast line), while those areas of Østfold who have fjord / coast line (Moss - Fredrikstad - Sarpsborg - Halden etc.) are called Ytre Østfold (Outer Østfold) and Nedre Glommaregionen (Lower Glomma Region). Glomma is the longest river in Norway and Scandinavia.

Derivation of name 
The word elv is Norwegian for River and stad is Norwegian for Place, and the name Elvestad probably got its name from the river Hobølelva, that follows the national road route Riksvei 120 some kilometers and together with this road route crosses E18 at the Elvestad intersection.

External links
Hobøl Kommune

Villages in Østfold
Populated places on the Glomma River